Daniela Walkowiak-Pilecka (born 24 May 1935) is a retired Polish sprint canoer who competed in the 500 m singles and doubles at the 1956, 1960 and 1964 Olympics. She won an individual bronze medal in 1960 and placed fourth-eighth in all her other events.

References

1935 births
Canoeists at the 1956 Summer Olympics
Canoeists at the 1960 Summer Olympics
Canoeists at the 1964 Summer Olympics
Living people
Olympic canoeists of Poland
Olympic bronze medalists for Poland
Polish female canoeists
Olympic medalists in canoeing
People from Włocławek County
Sportspeople from Kuyavian-Pomeranian Voivodeship

Medalists at the 1960 Summer Olympics